Minoan peak sanctuaries are widespread throughout the island of Crete (Greece).  Most scholars agree that peak sanctuaries were used for religious rites. In all peak sanctuaries human and animal clay figurines have been found.  Clay body parts, also called votive body parts, are also found in most peak sanctuaries.  These open-air sanctuaries are found high in the mountains of Crete.

Eastern and east-central peak sanctuaries
Most peak sanctuaries are found in east and east-central Crete.

 Petsofas is the only Minoan site with clay weasel and tortoise figurines
 Traostalos
 Kalamafki (also Kalamaki)
 Ziros Korphi tou Mare
 Xykephalo
 Vigla (also Viglos)
 Zou Prinias
 Plagia
 Etiani Kephala
 Modi
 Thylakas
 Maza
 Karfi

Central Crete peak sanctuaries

 Iouktas is probably the earliest of the peak sanctuaries.
 Tylissos (also Pyrgos Tylissos, not the same site as Pyrgos)
 Gonies Philioremos

Western Crete peak sanctuaries
 Vrysinas 
 Spili Vorizi
 Atsipades in the Korakias mountains was fully excavated in the 1980s. Its many hundred clay figurines and other ceramics have been analysed in detail.

Other peak sanctuaries
This section is for peak sanctuaries mentioned in passing in articles where more research is needed before categorizing them.
 Ambelos
 Mount Ida
 Korakomouri
 Mare

References